The Kansas City Defender is a news outlet primarily by and for African-American youth, especially in the Kansas City metropolitan area and the Midwestern United States more generally. They won the 2022 Community Engagement Award from Local Independent Online News (LION) Publishers for "engaging Black youth both in digital spaces, and real-life community events. Their stories on racism in schools sparked national coverage and conversations. Among other things, they work to understand the differences between the different audiences on different social media platforms and how to tailor their content to maximize the engagement of those different audiences. 

Kansas City Defender founder and publisher, Ryan Sorrell, insists, "young people are not unreachable. They are very interested in news. It just has to be produced and packaged the right way for them to be interested in consuming it". Defender community engagement efforts have included basketball park takeovers and grocery buyouts. Among other things, they speak directly to high school age youth, writing about them and their concerns and inviting them to contribute content.

Disappearing women 

On September 23 (Friday), 2022, The Kansas City Defender published a video on TikTok claiming that Black women had been disappearing off Prospect Avenue (Kansas City, Missouri), and nothing was being done about it. The following Monday the Kansas City, Missouri, Police Department said they had heard nothing about this.  News outlets in Kansas City and across the nation, including Newsweek and the Atlanta Black Star, chastised The Kansas City Defender for irresponsible journalism.  

Two weeks later, before 8 AM October 7 (also a Friday), 2022, a woman began running around Excelsior Springs, Missouri, knocking on doors and crying for help.  She said she had been held against her will, beaten, and sexually assaulted. She also said there had been other victims.  Police found the house in which the woman said she had been confined and staked out the place.  An hour later, the owner, Timothy Haslett, Jr., returned and was arrested and subsequently charged with first-degree rape, first-degree kidnapping, and second-degree assault -- vindicating the allegedly "irresponsible" initial report by The Kansas City Defender.

References

External links
 

Newspapers published in Missouri
Newspapers established in 2021
2021 establishments in Missouri